Nick Bosevski (born 2 December 1976) is an Australian footballer. He played two seasons for IFK Norrköping.

Bosevski spent most of his playing career in Australia with a spell at Liège, Belgium (then in Division 2) in 2000/2001 and at Norrköping, Sweden (2002 and 2003). He was a late-season addition to Norrköping in the 2002 Allsvenskan, making his debut at Landskrona on 12 September 2002.

Four days later, for his first match at Norrköping, he scored a hat-trick against Elfsborg. This was not enough to prevent the club from going down and Bosevski and Norrköping spent the next season in Superettan.

References

External links
 Nick Bosevski at Aussie Footballers

1976 births
Living people
Soccer players from Sydney
Marconi Stallions FC players
Bankstown City FC players
Sydney United 58 FC players
Bankstown Berries FC players
Sydney Olympic FC players
IFK Norrköping players
RFC Liège players
Johor Darul Ta'zim F.C. players
Rockdale Ilinden FC players
Australian people of Macedonian descent
Australian soccer players
National Soccer League (Australia) players
Association football forwards